Joy Alukkas is an Indian businessman from Kerala. He is the Chairman and Managing Director of Joyalukkas Group. As per the 2023 Forbes report he has a net worth of $3.1 billion. In February 2023, the Income Tax Department confiscated assets worth Rs 305 crore (Indian unit meaning ten million) of Joy Alukkas group as part of the raid on alleged black money transfer.

Early life 
His father, Varghese Alukkas, was a jeweller who started his first jewellery showroom in 1956.

Career 
In 2001, Alukkas founded Joy Alukkas Jewelry. The group is based in Thrissur, Kerala and Dubai. Joyalukkas has 85 showrooms in India and 45 showrooms across the globe. In 2012, Joyalukkas was authorized to sell Forevermark branded  diamonds from De Beers.

In 2018, Income Tax Department Kochi carried out an IT raid on over 130 showrooms and premises related to the group and unearthed Tax evasion and unaccounted sales of Gold jewellery to the tune of ₹500 crores.

In 2007, he opened the world's largest gold & diamond jewellery showroom, and the first Diamond Cave, in Chennai, India.

Other businesses headed by Joy Alukkas include Mall of Joy, a shopping retail destination, Jolly Silks, a silk fashion label, Joyalukkas Exchange, a money exchange platform, and Joyalukkas Lifestyle Developers, a real estate company.

Philanthropy 
In May 2018, Joy Alukkas donated ₹20,000,000 as a relief fund for victims of the Cyclone Ockhi. After the Kerala Floods in September 2018, the Joyalukkas Foundation announced that it would build 250 houses for those who have lost their homes.

Awards and accolades 
 Alukkas received ‘The Business Excellence Award 2016’ from Sheikh Nahyan Bin Mubarak Al Nahyan, UAE Minister of Culture, Youth and Social Development, organized by Indian Business Professionals Council (IBPC). (2016) 
 Listed in Forbes Magazine in both their World's Billionaire's list as well as their India's Rich list. (2018)
Best Indian Diamond Jewellery of the Year by Retail Jeweller Middle East innovation Awards (2019) 
Listed as the 69th richest Indian in Forbes India’s Richest List - 2022 (2022)

References

External links 
 

Businesspeople from Thrissur
1956 births
People from Kerala
Living people